Finke or Fincke is the name of:

Places
Australia
Finke, Northern Territory, a community in central Australia now known as Aputula
Finke bioregion, An IBRA region in the Northern Territory
Finke River, a river in central Australia
Finke Gorge National Park, a protected area in the Northern Territory
Mount Finke, a mountain in South Australia
Hungary
Finke a town city (ghetto) in Edelény of Hungary.
United States
Finke Opera House, an opera house in Missouri

Events

 Finke Desert Race, an annual off-road desert race from Alice Springs to Apatula (aka Finke), Northern Territory, Australia

People
 Fidelio F. Finke (1891–1968), German composer
 Fritz Finke, 19th-century German/American musician
 Leonhard Ludwig Finke (1747–1837), German physician
 Meinolf Finke, German writer and poet
 Nikki Finke (1953–2022), American journalist
 Peter Finke, German physicist
 Roger Finke, American academic
 Tommy Finke, German singer/songwriter/composer, see also German article
 Volker Finke, German soccer trainer, see also German article
 William Finke (1814–1864), pioneer in South Australia, sponsor of McDouall Stuart's exploration

Fincke 
 Gödik Fincke (c. 1546–1617), Finnish-born Swedish nobleman and military officer
 George Fincke (1953–2015), American Anglican bishop
 Michael Fincke, NASA astronaut
 Thomas Fincke

Other
 Finke coat of arms, a coat of arms used in Germany and Poland

References

Surnames from nicknames
German-language surnames